Education in Belgium is organised on the level of the three communities.

French Community of Belgium

Higher education 
In the French Community of Belgium, the approximate following grade scale applies to university and college students:

Grades for each course in the French Community's higher education system are noted on 20, with pass set at 10.

The grades on 20 and the percentages in brackets vary from one university/college to another and can even be different for different faculties within the same institution. Moreover, they are updated each year according to the proportion of students in each grade the preceding year, in the said faculty.

Academic grading does not occur at the end of each year anymore, but rather at the level of the entire degree.

Each university decides whether doctoral theses get grades (for instance, UCLouvain uses the same grading system for doctoral degrees) or not.

Secondary education 
Secondary school grades are delivered in percentages, with pass at 50% (sometimes 60%, i.e. for French language courses). While most secondary schools have suppressed honours and ranking of pupils, some still use them, like the Athénée Robert Catteau in Brussels, which uses a roughly equivalent system to universities, at the end of each year:

 Plus grande distinction: 90% – 100%
 Grande distinction: 80% – 89,9%
 Distinction: 70% – 79,9%
 Satisfaction: 60% – 69,9%
 Pass without honours: 50% – 59,9%
 Fail: < 50%

Flemish Community of Belgium 
In Flanders each university has a different grading system. At UGent the following grading system applies to higher education:
  niet geslaagd (Failure): if the student gets a score lower than 10/20 for one or more courses.
 voldoening (Sufficient): if the student gets a score of at least 10/20 for all courses.
 onderscheiding (Good): if the student gets an average weighted score of at least 13.5/20.
 grote onderscheiding (Very Good): if the student gets an average weighted score of at least 15/20.
 grootste onderscheiding (Excellent): if the student gets an average weighted score of at least 17/20.

References

Belgium
Grading
Grading